(literally 'The Post') is the state-owned provider of postal services in Ireland. An Post provides a "universal postal service" to all parts of the country as a member of the Universal Postal Union. Services provided include letter post, parcel service, deposit accounts, Express Post (an all-Ireland next-day delivery service), and EMS (international express-mail service).

Background

An Post, the Irish postal administration, came into being in 1984 when, under the terms of the Postal & Telecommunications Services Act of 1983, the Post Office services of the Department of Posts and Telegraphs (P&T) were divided between An Post and Telecom Éireann, the telecommunications operator now called Eir. At its inception, during the early years of the Irish Free State, the Department of Posts and Telegraphs was the country's largest department of state, and its employees (most of them postmen) constituted the largest sector of the civil service.

Prior to this, the Post Office in Ireland had been under the control of various Postmasters General, Irish and British, with the appointment of Evan Vaughan as postmaster in Dublin in 1638, generally accepted as the date for the establishment  of a semi-formal postal system in Ireland. Oliver Cromwell's Postal Act of 1657 created a combined General Post Office for the three kingdoms of Ireland, Scotland, and England; the position was affirmed by Charles II and his parliament by the Post Office Act of 1660.

As of 2020, An Post remains one of Ireland's largest employers but it has undergone considerable downsizing. In 2020, Munster's only sorting centre in Little Island, Cork closed. The closure of individual branches in rural areas has become a significant political issue. In 2014, all parts of An Post made a profit for the first time in eight years. As of 2018 there were approximately 1,100 An Post offices and over 100 postal agents across Ireland.

The Irish government announced the introduction of a postcode system, Eircode, in Ireland from 2008 though An Post was against the system at the time, saying it was unnecessary. The introduction of the postcode system took place on 13 July 2015, after almost a decade of delays.

All parcel post arriving in Ireland passes through An Post's mail centre in Portlaoise, where customs officials are on duty to inspect it.

An Post adopted its current logo on 14 December 2018; it did not make its first appearance until 13 March 2019. On branded signage, individual post offices are labelled  or (in English) 'Post Office'.

Subsidiaries and joint ventures
An Post is involved in a number of joint venture operations and also has several subsidiaries. It has complete ownership of some of these, while it is part-owner of others, such as the An Post National Lottery Company and the Prize Bond Company Limited.

An Post National Lottery Company
An Post held the licence granted by the Minister for Finance to run the National Lottery through its subsidiary, An Post National Lottery Company until February 2014. All employees of An Post National Lottery Company were seconded from An Post, and as such were employed and paid by An Post rather than by the subsidiary. Since 2014, the National Lottery has been operated by Premier Lotteries Ireland, in which An Post is a stakeholder.

An Post Transaction Services
In 2003, An Post set up a new division to run its post office and transaction services business, entitled An Post Transaction Services or PostTS. It rebranded its post offices network as "Post Office" or "Oifig an Phoist" with a new, white-and-red logo, and introduced banking services in conjunction with Allied Irish Banks. This followed the introduction of a service whereby newsagents could provide some Post Office services. This service, entitled PostPoint and operated as subsidiary of An Post, was originally formed in 2000 to sell mobile phone top-ups over-the-counter to Eircell subscribers.

In 2005 PostTS sold its foreign operations, and the rebranding effort largely reversed, with the traditional An Post logo restored to Post Offices. Between 2005 and 2006, An Post sold its interest in the Post TS UK and An Post Transaction Services businesses to Alphyra, for a reported €59.3m.

Geodirectory
Jointly established by An Post and Ordnance Survey Ireland, Geodirectory is a service that provides a database of buildings and addresses in Ireland, as well as their geolocation details. It holds records for 2.2 million properties that receive post. GeoDirectory assigns each property its own individual "fingerprint" – a unique, verified address in a standardised format, together with a geocode which identifies every property in the country. Geodirectory also operates a mobile app called GeoFindIT.

Postbank
On 5 October 2006 An Post signed an agreement for the creation of a joint venture with Fortis to provide financial services through the Post Office network. This joint venture with BNP Paribas was created to offer financial products and services to the Irish market, including daily banking, savings products, insurance, mortgages, and credit cards. PostPoint and the company's insurance business, One Direct, was to become part of the new company, with access to the Post Office network. In April 2007 a press launch was held for the new bank, which is to be known as Postbank (legally Postbank Ireland Limited, to distinguish from other similarly named operations such as Deutsche Postbank). By February 2010, the closure of the Postbank unit had been announced, and the operation was wound down by the end of December 2010.

Some counter business for AIB, Bank of Ireland and Ulster Bank can also be conducted at post offices.

Postbus
Between 1982 and 2004 the company operated a postbus route linking Ennis with parts of County Clare.

Television licensing
Television licensing is administered by An Post. It is responsible for the collection of revenue, inspection, and prosecution in cases of non-payment of the licence on behalf of the state.

An Post Mobile 
An Post runs a mobile virtual network operator (MVNO) using Vodafone's Irish network.

Developments

In 2009, An Post sponsored a postcard project, called "C Both Sides", which ran for a year, with the public being invited to create postcards on different themes.

In February 2012, the Commission for Communications Regulation (ComReg) launched legal proceedings against An Post over the quality of its service. An Post said it was "puzzled" by the decision.

In August 2018, it was announced that all post offices serving communities of fewer than 500 people (excluding offshore islands) were to be closed. However, three of these 159 branches were "spared" closure following local campaigns at Ballinskelligs (Kerry), Cliffoney (Sligo), and Ballycroy (Mayo).

See also

 An Post Museum
 Communications in Ireland
 General Post Office, Dublin
 List of companies of Ireland
 Postage stamps of Ireland
 Postal addresses in Ireland

Notes

References

External links

Financial services in the Republic of Ireland
Ire
Republic of Ireland postal system
State-sponsored bodies of the Republic of Ireland
Telecommunications companies of the Republic of Ireland
Transport companies established in 1984
Irish companies established in 1984